Ardú Vocal Ensemble are an award-winning a cappella group, based in Dublin, Ireland. They were founded in 2013 by tenor Ciarán Kelly. Ardú specialise in arranging well-known popular music for four, five and six voices, exploring the use of the voice as an instrument with percussive sounds as well as melody and harmony. Ardú have pioneered the genre of a cappella music in Ireland with performances at the Cork International Choral Festival, the Edinburgh Fringe Festival, London A Cappella Festival and have been featured on BBC Radio Ulster, RTÉ Lyric FM, RTÉ Radio 1 and The Ray D'Arcy Show on RTÉ 1.

In July 2017, Ardú hosted the first Irish International A Cappella Festival in Dublin. This included the second Ireland's A Cappella Competition and featured The Swingles as the headline act.

In October 2017, Ardú competed in the new talent show Sing: Ultimate A Cappella on Sky 1, hosted by Cat Deeley. Aired on 6 October 2017 on Sky 1 and Now TV.

Awards
Ardú were awarded first prize in both the National Chamber Choir category and the Light, Jazz and Popular Music category of the Cork International Choral Festival 2017. They were also awarded the John Mannion Memorial Trophy for their performance of 'Butterfly' by Mia Makaroff.

Ardú were awarded 1st prize in the National Vocal Ensemble Competition at the City of Derry International Choral Festival 2015. They were awarded runners up in the RTÉ Lyric FM Choirs for Christmas competition 2015 with their rendition of White Christmas, arranged by Fabio Alessi.

Recordings
Ardú Vocal Ensemble EP Back, In Time, released October 2014.
Ardú Vocal Ensemble debut album NOVA, released November 2015.

Other Work
In January 2016, Ardú were featured on the IrishJobs.ie “Add Your Voice” campaign alongside Irish choir Cantóirí. They recorded the original piece “Workplace Tango” composed and arranged by Ernest Dines.

References

A cappella musical groups